Oleksandr Serhiyovych Ponomaryov (born 7 January 1962 – disappeared 20 March 2022) is a Ukrainian economist and politician. He has served as a People's Deputy of Ukraine since 12 December 2012 from Ukraine's 78th electoral district, representing south-eastern Zaporizhzhia Oblast.

Political activity
From 2002 to 2006, Ponomaryov was a deputy of Zaporizhzhia Oblast Council. He was elected to the Berdiansk City Council in 2006 before again becoming a deputy of the Zaporizhzhia Oblast Council in 2010, on which he served until 2012.

In 2012, Ponomaryov was elected as a People's Deputy of Ukraine from Ukraine's 78th electoral district as an independent, representing south-eastern Zaporizhzhia Oblast and including Berdiansk. He was subsequently re-elected twice, in 2014 as an independent and 2019 as a member of Opposition Platform — For Life. In 2019, he won with 36.85% of the vote. His closest opponent was Vitalii Bohovin from Servant of the People, who gained 32.44% of the votes. He is chairman of subcommittee on the questions of roads and the public road system of the Verkhovna Rada of Ukraine Committee on Transport Questions.

Following the banning of OPZZh amidst the 2022 Russian invasion of Ukraine, it was reported that Ponomaryov had joined the Platform for Life and Peace in April 2022. Ponomaryov remained in Berdyansk after the beginning of the invasion and later moved to Crimea; he re-emerged in Ukraine in January 2023. In late 2021, it was reported that Ponomaryov holds Russian citizenship, and therefore is expected to lose his position as a people's deputy in 2023.

Russian citizenship controversy 
Ponomaryov applied for and received Russian citizenship in 2003. According to his application, he obtained citizenship because he had "lived continuously in Russia for at least 5 years." In February 2022, after "" had discovered Ponomaryov's dual citizenship, Ponomaryov could not explain the purpose for which he applied for Russian citizenship in 2003 and added that he "never used it." He also stated that he considered the passport annulled and did not know if it was valid.

2022 forced disappearance 
Following the 2022 Russian invasion of Ukraine and the Russian occupation of southern Zaporizhzhia Oblast, it was reported by the Berdiansk City Council that Ponomaryov was forcibly disappeared by Russian forces on 20 March 2022 for refusing to cooperate with occupational authorities. Leader of OPZZh Yuriy Boyko also claimed Ponomaryov had been abducted, saying, "I am appealing to all citizens for help. Our colleague Oleksandr Ponomaryov has disappeared and cannot be contacted. In Berdiansk, he helped people evacuated from Mariupol."

According to former member of the Berdiansk Raion Council Viktor Dudukalov, the Donetsk People's Republic was conducting an investigation into Ponomaryov regarding alleged financial support for the Azov Regiment and Right Sector. Following Ponomaryov's disappearance, multiple factories in Berdiansk were reported to have stopped working, either in protest of his disappearance or due to a lack of safety guarantees for the factories' workers.

References

External links
 
 Verkhovna Rada of Ukraine, official web portal

1962 births
Living people
People from Berdiansk
Naturalised citizens of Russia
Seventh convocation members of the Verkhovna Rada
Eighth convocation members of the Verkhovna Rada
Ninth convocation members of the Verkhovna Rada